There are many Grade I listed buildings in Mid Suffolk, a non-metropolitan district of in the county of Suffolk in England.

In the United Kingdom, the term listed building refers to a building or other structure officially designated as being of "exceptional architectural or historic special interest"; Grade I structures are those considered to be "buildings of "exceptional interest, sometimes considered to be internationally important. Just 2.5% of listed buildings are Grade I." The total number of listed buildings in England is 372,905. Listing was begun by a provision in the Town and Country Planning Act 1947. Listing a building imposes severe restrictions on what the owner might wish to change or modify in the structure or its fittings. In England, the authority for listing under the Planning (Listed Buildings and Conservation Areas) Act 1990 rests with English Heritage, a non-departmental public body sponsored by the Department for Culture, Media and Sport.

Mid Suffolk is a local government district with its administrative headquarters at Needham Market, while the main town in the district is Stowmarket. The other town in the area is Eye.  The number of inhabitants of the area is 93,800 with a density of 108 inhabitants per km2. The whole district is parished and divided among 122 civil parishes.

The district contains the highest amount of listed buildings in Suffolk, which are 4,062; it should be also mentioned that the area has 21 scheduled monuments and 31 conservation areas.

Mid Suffolk

|}

See also
Grade I listed buildings in Suffolk

Notes

References

External links

Mid Suffolk